Chan Yung-jan and Chuang Chia-jung were the defending champions, but Chan did not compete this year. Chuang teamed up with Mariana Díaz Oliva and lost in the final to Virginia Ruano Pascual and Paola Suárez, 6–2, 6–3.

Seeds

Draw

Draw

References
 Main Draw

2006 Doubles
Korea Open Doubles
Korea Open Doubles